Laborem exercens (Latin: Through Work) is an encyclical written by Pope John Paul II in 1981, on human work. It is part of the larger body of Catholic social teaching, which traces its origin to Pope Leo XIII's 1891 encyclical Rerum novarum.

Context
It had become customary for popes to publish new writings on social issues at ten-year intervals since Rerum novarum, in order to develop the teachings in concert with the evolving social context as a result of the industrial and political revolutions of the 20th Century. Laborem exercens was written in honor of the 90th anniversary, and makes reference to Rerum novarum and to several of the subsequent writings.

The pope was not able to issue the document on the May 15 anniversary because of the assassination attempt two days earlier. He published Laborem exercens a few months later, in September 1981.

Some of the trends mentioned by John-Paul II within the encyclical are:
 Increased use of technology, especially information technology, which John Paul predicted would bring changes comparable to the industrial revolution of the previous century.
 Environmental issues. The pope noted that some resources, particularly oil, were becoming scarce. Also, the need to protect the environment was becoming apparent.
 People in the developing world wanted to be more involved in the global economy. John Paul welcomed this trend, but feared it would bring unemployment for many skilled workers as work was distributed more widely.
Not mentioned in the encyclical, but surely in John Paul’s mind as he addressed the question of work, was the foundation of Solidarity, an independent trade union with strong Catholic roots, in his native Poland in 1980. John Paul knew Lech Wałęsa, Solidarity’s founder, and had met with him more than once during a homecoming visit in 1979.

Dignity of work
Laborem exercens begins with a scriptural argument that work is more than just an activity or a commodity, but an essential part of human nature.

The Church finds in the very first pages of the Book of Genesis the source of her conviction that work is a fundamental dimension of human existence on earth. ...When man, who had been created "in the image of God, ... male and female" (Gen 1:27), hears the words: "Be fruitful and multiply, and fill the earth and subdue it" (Gen 1:28), even though these words do not refer directly and explicitly to work, beyond any doubt they indirectly indicate it as an activity for man to carry out in the world.

Work was not a result of Adam’s sin, but was given to humanity from the moment of creation. John Paul draws from this passage the conclusion that work is essential to human nature, and that "man is the subject of work."

John Paul makes a distinction between work and toil. Work is an integral part of human nature; while toil, according to Genesis, was a consequence of sin. The two cannot be separated now, but we can still find the uplifting and fulfilling aspect of work, which John Paul names industriousness.

In the modern world there are many situations that tend to degrade the dignity of work. John Paul called these "threats to the right order of values." For example, when work is treated as a product to be sold, or when workers are considered as an impersonal "work force", then humans are being treated as instruments, and not as the subject of work. Other violations of dignity include unemployment; under-employment of highly skilled workers; inadequate wages to support life; inadequate job security; and forced labor.

John Paul recognized technology as a great benefit, provided it is regarded as a tool and not as a master. However, technology also presents some risks.

Labor and capital
In Laborem exercens, John Paul set forth the following basic priorities as a framework for discussing issues of labor, capital, and property ownership:
 Labor takes precedence over capital.
 People are more important than things.
For contrast, he named two ideas he considered to be errors: materialism and economism. Materialism subordinates people to property; while economism regards the value of human labour only according to its economic purpose. John Paul recommends instead a philosophy of personalism.

In a modern work-space it becomes very complex to establish ownership rights. Natural resources must be acknowledged as gifts of God, belonging to all. Any tools or technology used builds on prior work by countless generations, and continue to be influenced by those who use them in the present day.

Based upon this view, John Paul proposed a flexible and dynamic view of ownership and economics, and commended arrangements in which workers share in the ownership, such as shareholding by workers, joint ownership, and profit-sharing.

The indirect employer
John Paul examined the rights of workers in the context of a broader picture including both direct and indirect employers. A worker’s direct employer is "the person or institution with whom the worker enters directly into a work contract". Indirect employers are other persons, groups and structures that affect or constrain the direct employer.

As one example, John Paul mentions manufacturing companies in developed countries that purchase raw materials from less developed countries. If the purchasers insist on the lowest possible prices, the workers in another part of the world are indirectly affected. To create labor policies that ensure justice for every worker, it is necessary not only to work with the direct employers, but also to identify and coordinate the indirect employers.

John Paul suggests that this work properly belongs to governments as well as to international organizations such as the United Nations and International Labour Organization.

Rights of workers

Full employment
"We must first direct our attention to a fundamental issue: the question of finding work, or, in other words, the issue of suitable employment for all who are capable of it." The problem is not a lack of resources—"conspicuous natural resources remain unused"—but poor organization. The criterion of full employment will only be achieved through planning and coordination among all the indirect employers, and a better coordination of education with employment.

Wages and benefits
John Paul proposed a family wage, i.e. enough to support the worker and his family, as a minimum. Women with children have a right either to stay home, or to work outside the home with accommodation for their family responsibility. He also recommended benefits including health insurance, pensions, accident insurance, weekends and vacations as part of a "correct relationship between worker and employer."

Unions
John Paul re-asserted the importance of workers forming unions. This right is not limited to industrial workers, but belongs to every class and profession. He urges unions to view their struggle as a positive struggle for social justice, rather than a struggle against an opponent. He affirmed the right of unions to strike—"This method is recognized by Catholic social teaching as legitimate in the proper conditions and within just limits"—but "the strike weapon" is an extreme means that should rarely be used.

Dignity of agricultural work
The pope asserted the dignity of agricultural workers, and some particular difficulties and injustices they face. These include greater isolation; hard physical toil; inadequate wages, benefits, and training; and oppression of those who actually cultivate the soil by wealthy landowners. "In many situations radical and urgent changes are therefore needed in order to restore to agriculture—and to rural people—their just value as the basis for a healthy economy, within the social community's development as a whole."

Rights of disabled persons
Persons with disabilities have the same rights as other workers: "The disabled person is one of us and participates fully in the same humanity that we possess." The pope acknowledged costs and other barriers, but believes these can be overcome when communities work together with worker’s rights being a priority.

Emigration and work
John Paul expressed concerns about the phenomenon of people who emigrate, either permanently or seasonally, in search of work:
 Emigration means a loss to the person’s country of origin.
 Cultural adjustment is often difficult.
 People working away from their country of origin may be vulnerable to exploitation.

Each country should have laws to protect the rights of immigrant workers, so that they receive equal treatment.

Spirituality of work
Laborem exercens concludes with a section regarding the importance of work to Christian spirituality. John Paul encouraged the Church to develop and teach a spirituality of work. He suggested the following components of this:

 Human work and rest are a sharing in the activity of God, the Creator.
 Work is following in the footsteps of Jesus, a carpenter, and the Apostle Paul, a tentmaker. Many other examples of various occupations are given in the Old and New Testaments.
 "By enduring the toil of work in union with Christ crucified for us, man in a way collaborates with the Son of God for the redemption of humanity."

References

Further reading
Curran, Charles E. Catholic social teaching, 1891-present: a historical, theological, and ethical analysis. Georgetown University Press, Washington, D.C., 2002. 

Henriot, Peter J., DeBerri, Edward P., and Schultheis, Michael J. Catholic social teaching: our best kept secret. Orbis Books, Washington, D.C., 1992.

External links
English version (Vatican)
 Guided readings, with exposition, from Laborem exercens. VPlater Project (online modules on Catholic Social Teaching), Module A, Living Life to the Full, unit 4.3

Documents of the Catholic Social Teaching tradition
Papal encyclicals
Documents of Pope John Paul II
1981 documents
1981 in Christianity
September 1981 events